Le Tour de la Question is the first live album released by MC Solaar in 1998. The album featured two discs worth of previous and original material spanning his career.

Track listing
Nitro – 0:28
Zoom – 3:15
Dix de mes disciples – 3:49
Onzième commandement – 2:56
La concubine de l'hémoglobine – 4:39
Paradisiaque – 3:35
Qui sème le vent récolte le tempo – 3:02
Tournicoti – 3:52
Séquelles – 3:35
Caroline – 5:11
Obsolète – 3:22
Quand le soleil devient froid – 3:56
Illico presto – 4:00
Gangster moderne – 4:01

Nouveau western	– 4:33
La 5ème saison – 3:48
Bouge de là – 3:05
Victime de la mode – 2:50
Wonderbra – 2:43
Les temps changent – 3:39
Galaktika – 3:34
Dakota – 3:39
Les boys bandent – 3:23
Protège-tibia – 4:24
Les temps changent (final) – 4:49

External links
Dave's MC Solaar archive

MC Solaar albums
1999 live albums